Amelia Rose Blaire is an American actress. She is known for her roles as Willa Burrell on the HBO series True Blood and Piper Shaw on the MTV series Scream.

Career
Blaire studied acting at age fifteen when she first started classes at The Sanford Meisner Center for the Arts in Los Angeles, California. After a summer studying Shakespeare with the British American Drama Academy in London, she began working with Oscar-nominated actress Lindsay Crouse, who directed her towards the Atlantic Theater Company's two year conservatory program in New York City.  After graduating, she completed Atlantic's LA Program of master classes with David Mamet, Felicity Huffman, Clark Gregg and others. On August 23, 2013, it was announced that she had been promoted to a series regular on the HBO television series, True Blood.

On April 22, 2015, it was announced that Blaire joined in a recurring role as Piper Shaw in the first season of MTV's Scream.

Personal life
Blaire was born in New York City and raised in Los Angeles. In June 2017, Blaire announced her engagement to actor Bryan Dechart on Twitter. They married on June 30, 2018. She and her husband regularly stream video games on Twitch under the brand Dechart Games.

Filmography

Film

Television

Web

Video games

Music videos

Awards

References

External links

 
 

21st-century American actresses
Actresses from Los Angeles
American child actresses
American film actresses
American television actresses
Living people
American video game actresses
Year of birth missing (living people)